The 2007–08 Pura Cup was the 106th season of official first-class domestic cricket in Australia. Six teams representing six states in Australia participated in the competition. The 2007 competition began on 12 October, when the previous season's champions, Tasmania took on Queensland at the Gabba. New South Wales were crowned champions for the 45th time in their history as they beat Victoria by 258 runs in the Pura Cup final.

Table

The top two teams after each round is played will compete for the Pura Cup final. The match will be contested at the home ground of the side that finishes first. For an explanation of how points are rewarded, see Pura Cup Points System.

Teams

Fixtures

Round 1

Round 2

Round 3

Round 4

Round 5

Round 6

Round 7

Round 8

Round 9

Round 10

Final

Statistics

Highest Team Totals

Most Runs

Highest Scores

Most Wickets

Best Bowling Figures (Innings)

See also

 Australian One Day Domestic season 2007-08
 KFC Twenty20 Big Bash season 2007-08
 Australian cricket team in 2007-08

External links
 Cricket Web
 Cricket Australia
 Baggygreen

Sheffield Shield
Sheffield Shield
Sheffield Shield seasons